Hippolyte-Jules Pilet de La Mesnardière (1610, Le Loroux-Bottereau – 4 June 1663, Paris) was a French physician, man of letters and dramatist.

He was elected to the Académie française in 1655. He was a major figure in the next few years in the codification of the classical French drama, along with Jean Chapelain and François Hedelin d'Aubignac.

Bibliography
Traité de la mélancolie, sçavoir si elle est la cause des effets que l’on remarque dans les possédées de Loudun, tiré des Réflexions de M. [de La Mesnardière] sur le Discours de M. D. [Duncan] (1635) 
Raisonnemens de Mesnardière sur la nature des esprits qui servent aux sentimens (1638)
La Poétique (1639) 
Le Caractère élégiaque (1640)
Alinde, tragédie (1643) 
Lettre du sr Du Rivage contenant quelques observations sur le poème épique et sur le poème de la Pucelle (1656)
Les Poésies de Jules de La Mesnardière (1656)
La Sérénissime reyne de Suède Christine venant en France, sonnet au Roy (1656)
Chant nuptial pour le mariage du Roy (1660)
Relations de guerre, contenant : le secours d’Arras, en l’année 1654, le siège de Valence, en l’année 1656, et le siège de Dunkercke, en l’année 1658 (1662)
Pour le mariage de Mgr le comte et de Mlle Mancini, sonnet à son Altesse Sérénissime (s. d.)

Translation:
Pliny the Younger Panégyrique de Trajan (1638)

References

External links
 Académie française page 
 Biography by Jean-Claude Raymond 
  His drama 

1610 births
1663 deaths
17th-century French physicians
17th-century French poets
17th-century French male writers
17th-century French dramatists and playwrights
Members of the Académie Française